The D-class cruisers were a pair of German heavy cruisers, classified as  ("armored ships") by the  (Navy of the Realm). The ships were improved versions of the preceding s, authorized by Adolf Hitler in 1933. They were intended to counter a new French naval construction program. Only one of the two ships was laid down, but work was canceled less than five months after the keel was laid. It was determined that the designs should be enlarged to counter the new French . The construction contracts for both ships were superseded by the s.

Design 
The ships were designed as follow-ons to the s. In 1933, the rise of the Nazi Party brought Adolf Hitler to power in Germany. At the time, he opposed a large-scale naval rearmament program, but decided to allow limited construction to counter French naval expansion. It was determined, however, that a third turret could not be added to the ship and still remain within the 19,000 ton limit prescribed by Hitler.

The contract for the first ship, D, was awarded on 25 January 1934 to the Reichsmarinewerft in Wilhelmshaven. The ship's keel was laid on 14 February. That month, the Reichsmarine decided to alter the designs to counter the new s building in France. Construction on D was therefore halted on 5 July, and E was never laid down.

Characteristics 
The finalized design displaced  at the designed displacement. "D" was to have been fitted with accommodations to serve as a fleet flagship. The number of and type of boilers for the turbines is unknown, but they would have been vented through two large funnels.

The ships would have been similarly equipped to the preceding Deutschland-class ships. The ships would have mounted a main battery of six of the same /52 C/28 quick-firing guns in the same triple turret mounts, though eight guns were considered, had there been a quadruple turret available. The guns used two sets of propellant charges: a 36.0 kg (79.4 lb) fore charge in a silk bag and a 71.0 kg (156.6 lb) main charge in a brass case. The shells were fired at 910 meters per second (2,986 fps), and at maximum elevation of 40 degrees, a range of 36,475 m (39,890 yards). The guns had a rate of fire of 2.5 rounds per minute. The guns were supplied by a total of 900 shells, for a total of 150 rounds per gun.

The design's secondary battery comprised eight /55 SK C/28 quick-firing guns in four twin turrets, two abreast the conning tower and the other pair abreast the rear funnel. These guns had already been ordered by the time construction of the ships was canceled; their availability influenced the design of the Scharnhorst class, which mounted eight of their twelve 15 cm guns in dual turrets.

The heavy anti-aircraft battery consisted of eight  SK C/33 guns in twin mountings. The mounts were the Dopp LC/31 type, originally designed for earlier  SK C/31 guns. The LC/31 mounting was triaxially stabilized and capable of elevating to 80°. The guns fired fixed ammunition weighing ; the guns could fire HE and HE incendiary rounds, as well as illumination shells. A number of various other anti-aircraft guns were also to be fitted, but the details were not determined before the class was canceled. The ships were also armed with an unknown number of  torpedo tubes.

The D-class ships used steel manufactured by Krupp for their armor. The main armored deck was  forward,  amidships, and decreased to 70 mm towards the stern.

Footnotes

References 
 
 
 
 

Cruisers of the Reichsmarine
Proposed ships of Germany